Thabo (Τhα'βω) is a male and female African given name. It is short for "Lethabo" meaning "Happiness" or "Joy". It is a common name for South African men and women. It is most used in seSotho, Setswana and Sepedi [or Northern Sotho] and by some of the Nguni [Zulu, Xhosa, Swati and Ndebele] people.

Notable people with the name include:

Thabo Mbeki, former president of South Africa
Thabo Mofutsanyana, ANC activist
Thabo Makgoba, Anglican archbishop
Thabo Sefolosha, Swiss basketball player
Thabo Cele, footballer
Thabo Mabuza, rugby player
Thabo Malema, actor
Thabo Mamojele, rugby player
Thabo Manyoni, former Mayor of Mangaung Metropolitan Municipality 
Thabo Masheshemane, cricketer
Thabo Masualle, footballer
Thabo Masunga III, Masunga chief
Thabo Matlaba, footballer
Thabo Mboyi, footballer
Thabo Mmutle, South African Member of Parliament
Thabo Mngomeni, footballer
Thabo Moloi, footballer
Thabo Mooki, footballer
Thabo Motang, footballer
Thabo Motsieloa, Swedish television news presenter
Thabo Nodada, footballer
Thabo Nthethe, footballer
Thabo Qalinge, footballer
Thabo Rakhale, footballer
Thabo Rametsi, actor
Thabo Senong, football manager
Thabo September, footballer

Places
Thabo Mofutsanyane District Municipality in South Africa